The Lockport Subdivision is a railroad line owned by CSX Transportation in the U.S. state of New York. The line runs from Lockport west to a junction with the Niagara Subdivision east of Niagara Falls in Sanborn, New York along a former New York Central Railroad line. At its east end, it interchanges with the Falls Road Railroad and Somerset Railroad.

History
The line opened in 1838 as part of the Lockport and Niagara Falls Railroad. It became part of the New York Central and Conrail through leases, mergers, and takeovers, and was assigned to CSX in the 1999 breakup of Conrail.

See also
 List of CSX Transportation lines

References

CSX Transportation lines
Rail infrastructure in New York (state)
New York Central Railroad lines